Commandant's Quarters of Fort Gibson was built in 1868–70.  The building was listed on the National Register of Historic Places in 1985.

It was deemed significant as the residence of the commanding officer and his family, and as a "center of formal functions of celebration,
greeting and lodging for significant visiting dignitaries." Located adjacent to the parade grounds, "it served a point of
reference and reminder of the order of command present at the fort."

The larger Fort Gibson, which may include this building, was declared a U.S. National Historic Landmark in 1960.

It is located at 905 Coppinger Avenue in Fort Gibson.  It was built during 1868–70; its builder/architect was Captain A.S. Kimball.  It is a two-and-a-half-story, native stone building,  in plan.

References

Houses in Cherokee County, Oklahoma
Military facilities on the National Register of Historic Places in Oklahoma
Houses on the National Register of Historic Places in Oklahoma
National Register of Historic Places in Cherokee County, Oklahoma